Boiling Springs State Park is a park built  northeast of Woodward, Oklahoma, USA. It was built by the Civilian Conservation Corps in the 1930s.

History
The park originated in the 1930s and was named for its springs. It was constructed as a park from the natural environment by the Civilian Conservation Corps. The park received its current name because its sandy-bottom springs appear to be boiling because of the inrush of subsurface water. The water temperature is actually far cooler than boiling.

Native Americans, Spanish explorers, and pioneers have visited and inhabited the land used for the park. Spanish expeditions from Mexico are believed to have visited the area as early as 1541 as part of Francisco Vázquez de Coronado’s search for the fabled "Seven Cities of Gold". In 1641, another Spanish explorer – Juan de Oñate - reported that several Indian encampments were found near the cool springs and heavy timber of the area. In 1823, U.S. Cavalry General Thomas James established a fur trading post here. Captain Nathan Boone, son of Daniel Boone, explored the vicinity of the park in 1843 on an expedition originating from Fort Gibson in eastern Oklahoma. Pioneers flocking into this area during the land run of 1893 found the location quite suitable for farming and hunting. In the early 1900s, area residents were just beginning to find and enjoy the recreation potential of this site.

In 1935, much of the land comprising the present day park was acquired by the City of Woodward to provide a place for recreation for its citizens and visitors. Although the local "swimming hole" was already present, the primary development work was accomplished by the young men of Company 2822 of the Civilian Conservation Corps (CCC) from 1935 to 1939. A monument stands in the main picnic area of the park in honor of the contributions made by these men in making the park a place for so many to enjoy.

Geography
The park covers 820 acres and includes a small lake. It is located northeast of Woodward in a portion of Oklahoma known for a semi-arid climate and sparse vegetation. The park itself includes a forest of hackberry, walnut, soapberry (also called chinaberry), oak, and elm, attracting whitetail deer, wild turkey, raccoon, coyote, bobcat, beaver, badger, skunk, and opossum.

Northwestern Oklahoma includes three eco-regions known as the Sandstone Hills, Gypsum Hills and High Plains. Water rising rapidly to the surface from underground streams creates the appearance of "boiling" water on the springs.

Amenities
The park offers cabins, RV sites and tent campsites. It has an 18-hole golf course and hiking trails. The park provides a variety of services and facilities for the enjoyment of more than 200,000 visitors each year. Two camping areas can accommodate everything from pup tents to modern recreational vehicles. Cabins are situated beside the park's 5-acre lake. Group camps, community building, and numerous picnic facilities are available here along with a host of other activities including hiking, camping, swimming, fishing, exercise walking and wildlife observation.

Fees
To help fund a backlog of deferred maintenance and park improvements, the state implemented an entrance fee for this park and 21 others effective June 15, 2020.  The fees, charged per vehicle, start at $10 per day for a single-day or $8 for residents with an Oklahoma license plate or Oklahoma tribal plate.  Fees are waived for honorably discharged veterans and Oklahoma residents age 62 & older and their spouses.  Passes good for three days or a week are also available; annual passes good at all 22 state parks charging fees are offered at a cost of $75 for out-of-state visitors or $60 for Oklahoma residents.  The 22 parks are:
 Arrowhead Area at Lake Eufaula State Park
 Beavers Bend State Park
 Boiling Springs State Park
 Cherokee Landing State Park
 Fort Cobb State Park
 Foss State Park
 Honey Creek Area at Grand Lake State Park
 Great Plains State Park
 Great Salt Plains State Park
 Greenleaf State Park
 Keystone State Park
 Lake Eufaula State Park
 Lake Murray State Park
 Lake Texoma State Park
 Lake Thunderbird State Park
 Lake Wister State Park
 Natural Falls State Park
 Osage Hills State Park
 Robbers Cave State Park
 Sequoyah State Park
 Tenkiller State Park
 Twin Bridges Area at Grand Lake State Park

See also
Artesian Beach Park, Gage, Oklahoma
Salt Plains National Wildlife Refuge
Great Salt Plains State Park

References

External links
 Boiling Springs State Park
 Boiling Springs Facebook page

State parks of Oklahoma
Civilian Conservation Corps in Oklahoma
Protected areas of Woodward County, Oklahoma
Bodies of water of Woodward County, Oklahoma
Springs of Oklahoma
1935 establishments in Oklahoma